The Chameleon is a 2010 drama film directed by Jean-Paul Salomé, who co-wrote the screenplay with Natalie Carter. The film is based upon the true story of Frédéric Bourdin who impersonated a missing child named Nicholas Barclay in San Antonio, Texas, in the 1990s. Much of the true story was incorporated into the film although the years have been altered and the location was moved to Baton Rouge, Louisiana.

Plot
A young man (Marc-André Grondin) in France shaves off all his body hair and turns himself in to the police.  The man claims to be a 16-year-old boy from Louisiana named Nicholas Mark Randall, who had been missing for four years. His story is that he was kidnapped by a child prostitution ring in France who physically altered his appearance.

He is reunited with his family who immediately have their suspicions regarding his story.  His mother (Ellen Barkin) and half brother Brendan (Nick Stahl) do not seem to accept him, and many questions are open regarding whether this man could in fact be their lost family member, considering he bears little resemblance to the boy who left and now talks with a French accent.  His sister Kathy (Emilie de Ravin) accepts his story without hesitation and eventually so does his possible mother.

F.B.I. Agent Jennifer Johnson (Famke Janssen) strongly suspects that he is lying because she has had extensive experiences with people lying to her, including a man who was a child murderer whom she had dated.  Meanwhile, his story starts to unravel and the true story of what happened to Nicholas starts to emerge.

Cast

 Marc-André Grondin as Frederic Fortin / Nicholas Mark Randall
 Famke Janssen as F.B.I. Agent Jennifer Johnson
 Ellen Barkin as Kimberly Miller
 Emilie de Ravin as Kathy Jansen
 Tory Kittles as Dan Price
 Brian Geraghty as Brian Jansen
 Nick Stahl as Brendan Kerrigan
 Anne Le Ny as Frédéric's mother

Release
The film premiered at the 2010 Tribeca Film Festival in the United States.

Critical reception
The film received mostly mixed to negative reviews from critics. Review aggregator Metacritic gave the film a 41 out of 100, indicating "mixed or average reviews", based on 5 reviews. Stephen Holden of The New York Times said the film barely addresses the central issue of Nicholas being an imposter, except at the film's "unsatisfying, sentimental conclusion. Aaron Hillis of The Village Voice said the film's psychological, emotional, and moral implications are not explored.

References

External links 
 
 
 

2010 films
English-language Canadian films
English-language French films
2010 crime drama films
Drama films based on actual events
Films set in France
Films set in Louisiana
Films set in Spain
Films shot in France
Films shot in Louisiana
Crime films based on actual events
Gaumont Film Company films
French crime drama films
Films directed by Jean-Paul Salomé
Films produced by Ram Bergman
American crime drama films
Canadian crime drama films
Films scored by Bruno Coulais
Films about identity theft
French-language Canadian films
2010s English-language films
2010s Canadian films
2010s American films
2010s French films